Andrew ("Andy") Needham (born 23 March 1957, Calow, Derbyshire) is a former first-class cricketer, who represented Surrey and Middlesex, before representing Hertfordshire in the Minor Counties Championship.

First-class cricket career
Needham was a right-arm off-spinner, with a batting record that suggested he could be considered an all-rounder. He was 25 before finally becoming a Surrey first team regular in 1982. He made an immediate impact with the bat, scoring his maiden first-class hundred in just his third match of that summer, with 134 not out, from number nine in the batting order, adding 172 for the tenth wicket with Robin Jackman. He then went on to take 5–91 in the same match.

Needham scored three hundreds and passed 1000 runs for the only time in 1985, but at the end of the 1986 season "surprised many by moving north to join Middlesex. He stayed two seasons, becoming more of a utility player in one-dayers".

Minor counties and other
Needham went on to become a cricket coach at Watford Grammar School for Boys, where he had been a pupil. but he also became a significant player for Hertfordshire in the Minor Counties Championship from 1989 to 1994.

See also
List of Middlesex County Cricket Club List A cricketers#N

References

External links
 Cricinfo

1957 births
Living people
English cricketers
Surrey cricketers
Middlesex cricketers
Hertfordshire cricketers
People from Calow
Cricketers from Derbyshire